Only 2 of the 5 Mississippi incumbents were re-elected; the other 3 retired. The two Republican freshmen, Thad Cochran and Trent Lott, served Mississippi in the United States Senate together from 1989 to 2007.

See also 
 List of United States representatives from Mississippi
 United States House of Representatives elections, 1972

1972
Mississippi
1972 Mississippi elections